Jonathan Fletcher may refer to:

Jonathan Fletcher, English former minister of Emmanuel Church, Wimbledon
Jonathon Fletcher, English programmer of JumpStation, considered the "father of the search engine"

See also
Jonathan Fletcher House, historic building in Massachusetts, United States, built c.1835 by another Jonathan Fletcher